Marostica or Maròstega is a town and comune in the province of Vicenza, Veneto, northern Italy.

Marostica may also refer to:

Chanty Marostica, Canadian stand-up comedian
Don Marostica (born 1948), American real estate developer and legislator
Paolo Marostica, Italian lightweight rower